Scenario IV: Dread Dreams is an album by the band Sigh. It was released by Cacophonous Records originally in 1999.

This album shows the traits of Sigh continuing to explore their more well known avant-garde, experimental sound. An example would be on "Black Curse" where Sigh have a standard black metal sound that eventually part way through turns into a mild funk riff and a country guitar sound. Sigh would expand on this type of experimental sound on the album Imaginary Sonicscape.

This was their last album for the Cacophonous label. Their next album appeared on Century Media.

Track listing
All music by Sigh, except where noted.  Lyrics by Mirai, except where noted.

Personnel
Mirai: Vocals, Keyboard, Bass, Sampling, Programming, Vocoder
Shinichi: Acoustic & Electric Guitar
Satoshi: Drums, Percussion
Chie Kouno: Female chorus on tracks 1, 2 and 5
Damian: Chorus on tracks 4,7 and 8

Notes

1999 albums
Sigh (band) albums
Cacophonous Records albums